Magrabi Hospitals & Centers, founded in 1955, started as an eye hospital in Jeddah, Saudi Arabia. It was the first private specialized facility in the Middle East and Africa. It became the largest and first sub-specialized medical care network in the region, providing eye care to more than 500,000 patients and doing more than 5000,000 sight preserving surgeries annually.

In the late 1970s, Magrabi decided to expand their services by acquiring ENT and Dentistry practices.

In 1997, Magrabi Hospitals & Centers went into partnership with AMI Saudi Arabia Limited.

In 2009, IFC, a member of the World Bank Group, has partnered with Magrabi Hospitals & Centers to expand private eye care in MENA region, to address the need for ophthalmology services, and to bring clinical and patient care to underdeveloped markets in the region.

Magrabi Hospitals & Centers operates in nine countries in the Middle East & Africa. It has 32 hospitals and centers, 8 of which are charitable, 300 physicians and 600 nurses. The facilities host 40 operating theaters.

References

External links
 Official website
"Investing in Private Healthcare in Emerging Markets" (Washington: International Finance Corporation, 2009), p. 3, at http://www.ifc.org/wps/wcm/connect/ddf88a004970c1c7a06ff2336b93d75f/Health%2BBrochure%2B09.pdf?MOD=AJPERES .
"Magrabi Optical emerges as one of top international optical retailers," Arab News online, Dec. 2, 2014, at http://www.arabnews.com/news/668396 .
Biomed Middle East website, at https://archive.today/20150409022255/http://biomed.isethealthcare.com/country-profiles/saudi-arabia/hospitals/magrabi-hospital .
"Magrabi opens state-of-art eye hospital in DHCC," Middle East Monitor online, at http://www.middleeasthealthmag.com/may2009/meupdate.htm .
Jeddah Municipality website, at https://www.jeddah.gov.sa/english/Directories/SubCategories/Details/index.php?StartRow=20&MainID=3&SubID=6 .
Eurohealth Systems website, at http://eurohealthsystems.com/?post_type=projects&p=287 .

Hospitals in Saudi Arabia
Hospital networks